The 2019–20 Jackson State Tigers basketball team represented Jackson State University during the 2019–20 NCAA Division I men's basketball season. The Tigers were led by seventh-year head coach Wayne Brent, and played their home games at the Williams Assembly Center in Jackson, Mississippi as members of the Southwestern Athletic Conference. They finished the season 15–17, 11–7 in SWAC play to finish in a three-way tie for fourth place. They defeated Alcorn State in the quarterfinals of the SWAC tournament and were set to face Prairie View A&M in the semifinals until the tournament was cancelled amid the COVID-19 pandemic.

Previous season 
The Tigers finished the season 13–19 overall, 10–8 in SWAC play to finish in a three-way tie for third place. As the No. 3 seed in the SWAC tournament, they were upset by No. 6 seed Alabama State in the quarterfinals.

Roster

Schedule and results  

|-
!colspan=9 style=| Non-conference regular season

|-
!colspan=9 style=| SWAC regular season

|-
!colspan=9 style=| SWAC tournament

|- style="background:#bbbbbb"
| style="text-align:center"|March 13, 20202:30 pm, ESPN3
| style="text-align:center"| (4)
| vs. (1) Prairie View A&MSemifinals
| colspan=2 rowspan=1 style="text-align:center"|Cancelled due to the COVID-19 pandemic
| style="text-align:center"|Bartow ArenaBirmingham, AL
|-

Schedule Source:

References 

Jackson State Tigers basketball seasons
Jackson State
J
J